Sellers is an unincorporated community in Lewis County, in the U.S. state of Missouri.

History
A post office called Sellers was established in 1890, and remained in operation until 1907. The community has the name of John Sellers, a local merchant.

References

Unincorporated communities in Lewis County, Missouri
Unincorporated communities in Missouri